Gerhard de Beer (born 5 July 1994) is a former American football offensive tackle. He played college football at Arizona and was signed by the Buffalo Bills as an undrafted free agent in 2018. He has also played for the Green Bay Packers, Indianapolis Colts, Houston Roughnecks, and St. Louis BattleHawks.

Early life
De Beer was born and raised in South Africa. He played rugby and discus throw in high school at the Afrikaanse Hoër Seunskool. He moved to America to attend the University of Arizona to play American football. He redshirted his first season, but saw playing time for his final three seasons.

Professional career

Buffalo Bills
After going undrafted in the 2018 NFL Draft, de Beer signed with the Buffalo Bills on 11 May 2018. He was waived on 1 September 2018.

Green Bay Packers
On 27 November 2018 de Beer was signed to the Green Bay Packers practice squad. On 31 December 2018 he was signed to the active roster. He was waived on 31 August 2019 and became a free agent.

Indianapolis Colts
On 12 November 2019, de Beer was signed to the Indianapolis Colts practice squad, but was released three days later.

Houston Roughnecks
In the 2020 XFL Draft, de Beer was drafted to the Houston Roughnecks. He was waived during final roster cuts on 22 January 2020.

St. Louis BattleHawks
De Beer was signed to the XFL's practice squad team, referred to as Team 9, on 30 January 2020. He was signed off of Team 9 by the St. Louis BattleHawks on 9 March 2020. He had his contract terminated when the league suspended operations on 10 April 2020.

References

1994 births
Living people
Sportspeople from Pretoria
South African players of American football
American football offensive tackles
Arizona Wildcats football players
Buffalo Bills players
Green Bay Packers players
Indianapolis Colts players
Houston Roughnecks players
Team 9 players
St. Louis BattleHawks players